The State Register of Heritage Places is maintained by the Heritage Council of Western Australia. , of the places that are heritage-listed in the City of Nedlands, 22 are on the State Register of Heritage Places.

List
The Western Australian State Register of Heritage Places, lists the following 22 state registered places within the City of Nedlands:

Notes

References

Nedlands